Mid Hudson Conference (MHC) is a junior college conference in Region 15 of the National Junior College Athletic Association (NJCAA). The MHC was created to provide an association for two year colleges of the Mid-Hudson area. The conference was created to strengthen the work of member colleges in developing good sportsmanship and promote all forms of athletics for college students.  Conference championships are held in most sports and individuals can be named to All-Conference and All-Academic teams.

Member schools

Current members
The Mid-Hudson currently has six full members, all are public schools:

Notes

Former members
The Mid-Hudson had one former full member, which was also a private school:

Notes

See also
National Junior College Athletic Association (NJCAA)
Hudson Valley Intercollegiate Athletic Conference
City University of New York Athletic Conference, also in NJCAA Region 15

References

External links
 
 NJCAA Website

NJCAA conferences
College sports in New York (state)
Hudson Valley
1973 establishments in New York (state)